"Come Back Baby" is a 1940 song written by Walter Davis. The name may also refer to:

 "Come Back Baby", a 1965 song by Bluesology
 "Come Back Baby", a song from John Fahey's 1965 album The Transfiguration of Blind Joe Death
 "Come Back Baby", a song from Kate and Anne McGarrigle's 1978 album Pronto Monto
 "Come Back Baby", a song from Pusha T's 2018 album Daytona
 "Come Back Baby", a song from Sawyer Brown's 2002 album, Can You Hear Me Now
 "Come Back Baby", a song from 1999 re-release of Reminiscing (Buddy Holly album)
 "Come Back Baby", a pre-Steely Dan song by Walter Becker and Donald Fagen appearing on Found Studio Tracks among other compilations
, a 1990 single by Dan Reed Network